Aleksandra Vrebalov (born September 22, 1970) is a Serbian composer based in New York City.

Biography
She studied composition with Miroslav Statkic at Novi Sad University, then with Zoran Erić at Belgrade University, Elinor Armer at the San Francisco Conservatory of Music, and Ivana Loudová at the Prague Academy of Music. She obtained her Doctor of Musical Arts degree from the University of Michigan where she studied with Evan Chambers and Michael Daugherty.

She has had residences at the Rockefeller Foundation Bellagio Center, Tanglewood, New York's New Dramatists, MacDowell Colony, and American Opera Projects among others. She has received Awards or Fellowships from the American Academy of Arts and Letters Charles Ives Fellowship, Meet the Composer, Highsmith Composition Competition, Vienna Modern Masters, Serbian Fond for an Open Society, ASCAP Awards, and Douglas Moore Fellowship.

Her early string quartet Pannonia Boundless, evoking eastern European sonorities, has been recorded by the Kronos Quartet on their album Kronos Caravan (1999) and published by Boosey & Hawkes (2007). The Kronos Quartet, with clarinetist David Krakauer, premiered her 40-minute "Babylon, Our Own", commissioned for the 10th anniversary season of the Clarice Smith Performing Arts Center at the University of Maryland in College Park, Maryland, in September 2011.

In her more developed orchestral work Orbits (2002), Vrebalov uses overlapping densities of sonorities and rhythmic proportions such as the Fibonacci series to portray her idiosyncratic post-modern conception of musica universalis.

Her music for the ballet The Widow's Broom (2004) based on Chris Van Allsburg's book has been performed on Halloween by the Festival Ballet Providence.

She has received commissions from Kronos Quartet, Carnegie Hall (co-commission), Barlow Endowment, Festival Ballet Providence, Merkin Concert Hall Zoom Series. Vrebalov is also a co-founder of South Oxford Six, a composers' collective in New York.

In October 2011 her 2-act opera Mileva, on a libretto by Vida Ognjenović based on her play, was premiered at the Serbian National Theater in Novi Sad, with a repeat performance at the Sava Center in Belgrade as part of the Belgrade Music Festival (BEMUS). The opera was commissioned to mark the 150th anniversary of the Serbian National Theater. The scenario centers on the character of Mileva Marić, the Serbian physicist and mathematician who was Albert Einstein's first wife.

References
Ira Prodanov, "Gudački kvartet br. 1 Aleksandre Vrebalov", Novi zvuk: Internacionalni casopis za muziku 9 (1997) 55-58
Ira Prodanov, "String quartet no. 1 by Aleksandra Vrebalov", New sound: International journal for music 9 (1997) 55-58
Ira Prodanov, "Samples in the work of A. Vrebalov", Exclusivity and coexistence: The 5th international symposium Folklore-Music-Work of art (Beograd: Fakultet muzičke umetnosti, 1997),157-164
Tatjana Marković, "O/u orbitama Aleksandre Vrebalov", Novi zvuk: Internacionalni časopis za muziku 27 (2006) 61-64
Tatjana Marković, "On/in the Orbits of Aleksandra Vrebalov", New sound: International journal for music 27 (2006) 61-64
Tatjana Marković, "Vrebalov, Aleksandra", Die Musik in Geschichte und Gegenwart, 2nd ed., ed. by Ludwig Finscher (Kassel: Bärenreiter; Stuttgart: Metzler, 2008), 1053-1054
Adrian Kranjčević & Mirko Sebić, "Aleksandra Vrebalov: Stanice na putu", Nova misao: Časopis za savremenu kulturu Vojvodine 1 (July 2009), 26-36
Carnegie Hall Commissions page on Vrebalov, accessed 11 February 2010
New York Times review by Vivien Schweitzer (25 February 2008), accessed 11 February 2010

External links
Official website of Aleksandra Vrebalov
The Widow's Broom
South Oxford Six biographical page, accessed 12 February 2010
Kronos Quartet
Dnevnik Interview (Serbian)
 (Serbian; opera "Mileva")

1970 births
Living people
Serbian composers
21st-century classical composers
Musicians from Novi Sad
San Francisco Conservatory of Music alumni
University of Belgrade alumni
University of Michigan School of Music, Theatre & Dance alumni
Women classical composers
21st-century American musicians
Serbian emigrants to the United States
21st-century American women musicians
21st-century women composers